Uryupinsky District is an administrative district (raion), one of the thirty-three in Volgograd Oblast, Russia. As a municipal division, it is incorporated as Uryupinsky Municipal District. It is located in the northwest of the oblast. Its administrative center is the town of Uryupinsk (which is not administratively a part of the district). Population:  30,615 (2002 Census);

Administrative and municipal status
Within the framework of administrative divisions, Uryupinsky District is one of the thirty-three in the oblast. The town of Uryupinsk serves as its administrative center, despite being incorporated separately as a town of oblast significance—an administrative unit with the status equal to that of the districts.

As a municipal division, the district is incorporated as Uryupinsky Municipal District. The town of oblast significance of Uryupinsk is incorporated separately from the district as Uryupinsk Urban Okrug.

References

Notes

Sources

Districts of Volgograd Oblast
